The Lorenzo Crandall House is an historic house in Pawtucket, Rhode Island.  It is a -story wood-frame structure, built in 1848–49 for (and probably by) Lorenzo Crandall, a carpenter.  It features modest Greek Revival styling, including corner pilasters, a wide banded cornice, and molded window caps.  It is a well-preserved example of a type of housing that was once quite common in Pawtucket, but is no longer.

The house was listed on the National Register of Historic Places in 1984.

See also
National Register of Historic Places listings in Pawtucket, Rhode Island

References

Houses completed in 1848
Houses on the National Register of Historic Places in Rhode Island
Houses in Pawtucket, Rhode Island
Greek Revival houses in Rhode Island
National Register of Historic Places in Pawtucket, Rhode Island